Andhra Pradesh Model Schools (ఆదర్శ పాఠశాల) లేదా (మోడల్ స్కూల్ ) or AP Model School's (2013) is an English-medium Government Model school in Andhra Pradesh. The Government of Andhra Pradesh, which owns and runs schools in educationally backward districts, originally intended to start around 355 schools in the first phase and 400 in the second phase. Due to state bifurcation (2014), 192 were allotted to Telangana State and 163 Model Schools were allotted to residual Andhra Pradesh. For implementation of the above scheme, Government Sanctioned (7100) newly created posts by Direct Recruitment and (5074) newly created post on outsourcing basis at State, District and School Level.

History
The first model school in the state was opened at PATIPALLI in MUNAGAPAKA mandal in Visakhapatnam by the Chief Minister of Andhra Pradesh Sri N.Kiran kumar Reddy in 2013.

The Model School Scheme is no longer funded by the Government of India, and responsibility for the programme has been transferred to the states. Teachers demand State Government to take over Model schools.

References

External links
 Andhrapradesh Model schools
 http://samagra.mhrd.gov.in/index.html
https://cse.ap.gov.in/DSE/

Government schools in India

https://rmsa.tg.nic.in/Model%20Schools.html